The 2003 Reading Borough Council election was held on 1 May 2003, at the same time as other local elections across England and Scotland. One third of the 45 seats on Reading Borough Council were up for election. The Conservatives gained one seat at the election from Labour. Otherwise all other seats stayed with the same party and Labour continued have a large majority on the council, with David Sutton continuing as leader of the party and the council.

Results

Ward results
The results in each ward were as follows:

References

2003 English local elections
2003